Samuel Sharpe (13 January 1839 – 5 November 1924) was an English cricketer. Sharpe was a right-handed batsman who bowled right-arm medium pace. He was born at Ruddington, Nottinghamshire.

Sharpe made two first-class appearances for Nottinghamshire in 1868, against Lancashire and Yorkshire, with both matches played at Trent Bridge. In his first match, Lancashire won the toss and elected to bat first, making 74 all out. In response, Nottinghamshire made 296 all out in their first-innings, with Sharpe scoring 13 runs before he was dismissed by William Hickton. Lancashire were then dismissed for 148 in their second-innings, handing Nottinghamshire victory by an innings and 74 runs. In his second match, Yorkshire won the toss and elected to bat, making 213 all out. Responding in their first-innings, Nottinghamshire were dismissed for just 60, with Sharpe himself opening the batting and being dismissed for 5 runs by Roger Iddison. Forced to follow-on in their second-innings, Nottinghamshire made 158 all out, with Sharpe being dismissed for 11 runs by Tom Emmett. Yorkshire went on to win the match by 9 wickets.

He died at the village of his birth on 5 November 1924. His son, John, played Test cricket for England.

References

External links
Samuel Sharpe at ESPNcricinfo
Samuel Sharpe at CricketArchive

1839 births
1924 deaths
People from Ruddington
Cricketers from Nottinghamshire
English cricketers
Nottinghamshire cricketers